Eunicea mammosa is a species of soft coral of the family Plexauridae, described by Jean Vincent Félix Lamouroux in 1816. Common names for the species include swollen-knob candelabrum.

References

Corals described in 1816
Plexauridae